Benjamin Wells (born 26 March 1988) is a football midfielder who is a product of the Swindon Town youth set-up.

Wells made his first-team debut as a substitute against Huddersfield Town as Swindon faced the impossible task of defending a game down to 9-men after the sendings off of David Duke and Rory Fallon. Swindon lost 4–0.

In the following 2005/06 season Wells featured from the bench 4 times and it wasn't until his appearance in the last game of the campaign against Huddersfield could Wells boast playing a first team match without losing. He was released in May 2007.

Wells signed a one-year contract with Basingstoke Town Football Club in July 2007, Ben featured for Basingstoke Town Football Club last season during a loan spell from Swindon and put in several strong performances, including being part of the memorable FA Cup win at Chesterfield. He was recalled to Swindon straight after the Chesterfield game and was crucially unable to feature in the 2nd Round tie against Aldershot.

After a spell with Weston-super-Mare, he signed for Swindon Supermarine in 2010.

References

External links
 
 Ben Wells Basingstoke Town Profile

Swindon Town F.C. players
Living people
1988 births
Association football midfielders
English Football League players
Basingstoke Town F.C. players
Weston-super-Mare A.F.C. players
Swindon Supermarine F.C. players
Cirencester Town F.C. players
English footballers